Woha is a town and administrative district which serves as the capital of the Bima Regency, on the eastern part of the island of Sumbawa, in central Indonesia's province West Nusa Tenggara. It is connected by provincial road to the towns of Bima and Sape.

Geography
The town is located on the eastern part of the Sumbawa island.

Administration
The town is divided into administrative villages (kelurahan).

Sister Towns
 Kulim, Malaysia

References

External links 
 

Populated places in West Nusa Tenggara
Regency seats of West Nusa Tenggara